Mark Griffiths may refer to:
 Mark Griffiths (musician), British bassist
 Mark D. Griffiths, English psychologist